Caleb Martin may refer to:

Caleb Martin (American football) (1924–1994), American football tackle
Caleb Martin (basketball) (born 1995), American basketball player
Caleb Joseph (born 1986), also known as Caleb Martin Joseph, American baseball player
Caleb Martin House, historic house in Connecticut